Anes Saad (born January 19, 1996) is an Algerian footballer who plays for USM Khenchela in the Algerian Ligue Professionnelle 1.

References 

1996 births
Living people
Algerian footballers
Association football defenders
ES Sétif players
USM Bel Abbès players
Algerian Ligue Professionnelle 1 players
21st-century Algerian people